Phrae is one of Thailand's seventy-six Provinces (changwat) lies in upper northern Thailand. Neighboring provinces are (from north clockwise) Phayao, Nan, Uttaradit, Sukhothai, and Lampang.

Geography
Phrae is in the valley of the Yom River. The Phi Pan Nam Range runs across the province from north to south in the west. The Phlueng Range is in the east.

National parks
There are a total of four national parks, three ofwhich with seven other national parks, make up region 13 (Phrae), and Lam Nam Nan in region 11 (Phitsanulok) of Thailand's protected areas.
 Lam Nam Nan National Park, 
 Mae Yom National Park, 
 Wiang Kosai National Park, 
 Doi Pha Klong National Park,

Wildlife sanctuaries
There are two wildlife sanctuaries.
 Lam Nam Nan Fang Khwa Wildlife Sanctuary, 
 Doi Luang Wildlife Sanctuary,

History
The history of Phrae dates back to the Haripunchai kingdom of the Mon. It became part of Lan Na in 1443, when King Tilokaraj was on an expedition to capture Nan.

Symbols
Provincial seal: According to legend the two cities of Phrae and Nan were once ruled by brothers. When they met to divide the land between them the one from Phrae rode on a horse, the one from Nan on a buffalo to the meeting point on top of a mountain. Hence Phrae uses a horse in their seal, while Nan uses a buffalo. When the provincial government proposed the seal in 1940, the Fine Arts Department suggested adding a historic building to the seal in addition to the horse, thus it now has the stupa of Phra Tat Cho Hae on the back of the horse. This temple is about nine kilometers southeast of the city of Phrae.

The provincial flower and tree is the Burmese Almondwood (Chukrasia tabularis). The provincial fish is black sharkminnow (Labeo chrysophekadion).

Human achievement index 2017
Since 2003, United Nations Development Programme (UNDP) in Thailand has tracked progress on human development at sub-national level using the Human achievement index (HAI), a composite index covering all the eight key areas of human development. National Economic and Social Development Board (NESDB) has taken over this task since 2017.

Administrative divisions

Provincial government
The province is divided into eight districts (amphoes). These are further divided into 78 subdistricts (tambons) and 645 villages (mubans).

Local government
As of 26 November 2019 there are: one Phrae Provincial Administration Organisation and 26 municipal (thesaban) areas in the province. Phrae has town (thesaban mueang) status. Further 25 subdistrict municipalities (thesaban tambon). The non-municipal areas are administered by 57 Subdistrict Administrative Organisations - SAO (ongkan borihan suan tambon).

Transportation
The main road through Phrae is Route 101, which begins in Nan to the north, passes through Phrae, and leads to Sawankhalok, Sukhothai, and finally Kamphaeng Phet.

Phrae Airport is a small airport in Mueang Mo, on the east side of town. It handles only domestic flights from Don Mueang (DMK).

The provincial railway station is Den Chai in Den Chai District,  from Phrae town, since the town of Phrae does not have a rail to reach.

Tourism

Wiang Kosai National Park (อุทยานแห่งชาติเวียงโกศัย) contains two waterfalls, the Mae Koeng Luang (น้ำตกแม่เกิ๋งหลวง), and the Mae Koeng Noi (น้ำตกแม่เกิ๋งน้อย). Streams from the falls flow into the Yom River.

Tham Pha Nang Khoi Cave (ถ้ำผานางคอย). At the end of the cave is a stalagmite shaped like a woman holding a small child. In front of the Nang Koi (waiting woman) stone is a heart-shaped stalactite. They are the source of the legend of the love of a woman who waited for her lover until she turned to stone.

Mae Yom National Park and well-known Phae Mueang Phi Forest Park.

In addition, Phrae is also a province full of historic buildings. These buildings, all over 100 years old, were built in the Rattanakosin period or being used in the wood trading business that was once prosperous in the past.

References

External links

Phrae province website
Phrae provincial map, coat of arms and postal stamp 
 Knowledge of Encyclopediathai Travel & Country Guides Welcome to Phrae province

 
Provinces of Thailand